Tangcal, officially the Municipality of Tangcal (Maranao: Inged a Tangcal;), is a 5th class municipality in the province of Lanao del Norte, Philippines. According to the 2020 census, it has a population of 16,075 people.

It is also pronounced as Tangkal.

Geography
It is located about 51 kilometers in the southwest of Iligan City, the commercial center of Lanao del Norte. Geographically, Tangcal is bounded by the municipalities of Tubod, Magsaysay and Maigo on the north, Munai on the east, Nunungan on the south, and Magsaysay on the west.

Barangays

Tangcal is politically subdivided into 18 barangays.

Climate

History

In 1956, the barangays of Tangcal, Berowar, Pangao, Tawinian, Lumbac, Lawigadato, Somyorang, Bayabao, Pilingkingan, Ramain, Bagigicon, Lamaosa, Meladoc Big, Meladoc Small and Rarab, then part of Kolambugan, were constituted into the municipal district of Tangcal. Later on, some barangays of the municipality of Munai were also consolidated.

The Batingolo and Mutia families, the prominent political families in Tangcal are from Munai. 
A land portion of Tangcal is elevated. Coconut and corn were the main agricultural products of the town.

Maranao Traditional Government
 Sultan of Bayabao is the highest traditional position in municipality of Munai and municipality of Tangcal. Sultan of Bayabao term was originally and honorary given by the Sultan of Bayabao in Ramain, Lanao del Sur to the old-old Datus before as sign of friendship according to the folk story. As prove, there is name barangay Bayabao in the municipality. Ramain was the one of the originally govern using Sultan traditional government.
 Sultan of Kapatagan is the key figure and state man being the traditional historian of all the families living in munai and tangcal 
 Sultan of Adel a Maamor
 Sultan of Linao
 Sultan of Punud
 Sultan of Tangcal Proper
 Sultan of Beruar

Tribal leader who fought against American invasion
Datu Mayoma was one of the Moro tribe who held and fight the American soldiers at the time of American invasion. His remain is in Barangay Linao where he holds and fight with American troops.
During the American escalation the lanao del Norte, Datu Mayoma had learned that the American troops were going direction to Tangcal, then he goes to the middle of mountain they called it now Barangay Linao to deck for his small Camp. Few days later, American troops are now reached barangay Linao where small Camp Datu Mayoma located and he is there alone and waiting them.
According to the old elders story, Datu Mayoma made a traditional ceremonial first (Sagayan in maranao term) before he start to fight against American troops, however and on other hand, easy to the American troops to kill him since ceremonial takes almost an hour, for that when he starts to strike using his sword aiming to the American soldiers, on process they just fire at him because they are ready and watching.

Community Practice before Martial Law
Tangcal before was one of the very peaceful municipality in Lanao del Norte. Muslim (Maranao Tribe) and Non-Muslim (Christian) they live together as one Community. Most of the Muslim Male married with Christian Female, and their children are peacefully live together. There is Traders Market where Muslims from interior areas and Christians from urvan areas particular in Kolambugan exchange their goods and traditional items.

There was a Christian church build in Barangay Small Banisilon but it was destroyed during Martial Law. There was a schedule of Disco Club gatherings "Baylehan in bisaya term" where all young ladies and young gentlemen including their parents were they meet together just for exchange of cultural and social life. There was also a Contest Competition Program for Mister and Miss of Municipality of Tangcal, which one of the contestant that time who won for Miss Tangcal is Sittie Fatima Mangansan Mutia-Tomawis a Municipal Mayor of Tangcal.

However and suddenly, all the practices has been totally stopped when Late Aleem Ansari Mangansan Mutia an Elder Brother of Mayor Sittie Fatima Mangansan Mutia-Tomawis who came from abroad for Islamic Study. Aleem Anshari had advised his Sisters and Brothers and announced in the Public Mosque that those practices (Disco and Mister and Miss Tangcal) are "Sin" to Islam.

Collecting of Land Tax

Majority people living in Tangcal were happy because of the simple living because they do not have any worry at all just can eat any food every day, but, they have panic when the land have taxes.

When then President Diosdao Macapagal signed the Land Reform Law to have tax from the Land. In Tangcal there are so many Land Lords but just few Land Lords could provide tax for their lands. On the first process of collecting taxes, sometimes the land lords give the livestock, food, crops just to pay their obligation, however and later soon, the landlords has divided their land to children's, close relatives do not have enough lands and even helpers and workers just to accommodate the paying of much land taxes.

Folk History of Mutia Family
Originally and before Spain Invasion and later American Invasion, the tradition of the Maranao Tribe Leaders is to have workers “personal helpers” or BISAYA in maranao term (no salary but only shelter and protection). They usually cross the beach of municipality of Kolambugan to beach of Ozamis City by boat to catch food or a people living in other side land and make them as workers “personal helpers” or BISAYA.

There is a claim story from old maranao tribe leaders that there are Seven (7) Son of Tribe Leader name Datu Mutia living in the interior area in Lanao del Norte. They go out and cross the sea between Kolambugan and Ozamis City to search and catch human in order to become their own workers' “personal helpers” or BISAYA, however, after long time of searching six (6) of them have return but one of them did not and stay.

On other hand, there was a claim story that Mutia Families in Zamboanga del Norte and Misamis Occidental has originally blood from the people living in Interior area in Lanao del Norte, and even now the claim is still existing because of their great-great-great grandfather of great-great grandfather of Mutia Families in Zamboanga del Norte and Misamis Occidental has lifted a one small piece of book hanging in the center of the big house and told to his children the book is forbidden and do not touch it or even to it, however and long for many years when somebody open “because of their confusion why the book is forbidden” they saw writing inside the book but not familiar language or letters (Spanish language, English language), and some say that the drawings or the direction of letters are near to Arabic letters.

Demographics

Majority of people living in Tangcal are all Maranao tribe and they are supporters of MILF and MNLF. All the social life and justices are always refer to MILF and MNLF rules "Sharia Law"

Economy

List of local products
Corn
Coconut
Lumber
Livestock
Falcata
Banana

Government
Elected officials 2022–present:
 Municipal Mayor: Sittie Aisah Mutia Tomawis - Adiong
 Vice Mayor: Fatima Mangansan Mutia - Tomawis
 Sangguniang Bayan:
 Saidali Diragon
 Salamat Mauyag
 Jonaid Liawao
 Elias Tondia
 Norania Gagaso
 Aminollah Mostari
 Moda Dital
 Soud Batingolo
 ABC President: Abalos Mapandi Macondara
 SB Secretary: Mr. Camilo Batingulo

List of former executives
Mayors after People Power Revolution 1986:

Vice Mayors after People Power Revolution 1986:

Tourism
Kendis River
Piyamunitan River
Titunod River
Linao River
Banisilon River
Lindongan River

Education
 Banisilon Elementary School
 Beruar Integrated School
 Big Banisilon Integrated School
 Pelingkingan Integrated School
 Somiorang Elementary School
 Tangkal Proper Elementary School
 Tangcal National High School
 Sultan Mimbisa Primary School
 Bayabao Primary School
 Sultan Lindongan Primary School
 Lingco-an Primary School
 Lamausa Primary School

References

External links
 Tangcal Profile at the DTI Cities and Municipalities Competitive Index
 Official site of Tangcal
 [ Philippine Standard Geographic Code]
 Philippine Census Information
 Local Governance Performance Management System

Municipalities of Lanao del Norte